Tulunan, officially the Municipality of Tulunan (Jawi: ايڠايد نو تولونن), is a 2nd class municipality in the province of Cotabato, Philippines. According to the 2020 census, it has a population of 60,978 people.

History
The Tulunan is derived from a Maguindanaon word “tulun” which means “a place of abundance” or “where grace fall”.  The early settlers of the place were mostly Muslim tribes who settled in the lowlands. The nomadic tribes like the B'laans, Bagobos and Tirurays occupied the hills and mountains. The first system of government was datuism and the first ruling datu of the place was believed to be Datu Enok.

During the period when Tulunan was ruled by Datu Enok the inhabitants enjoyed the abundance of life through their bountiful harvest from their kaingin. Because of the generosity of nature, the place was named “Tulunan” which was derived from a Muslim word “tulun” which means “abundance of grace”.

The early inhabitants consisted of small groups of nomads which subsisted by hunting. They lived a life with few needs which they provided through contacts with other groups changed and improved their way of life. They learned better system of doing things. When Mohammedanism was introduced in Mindanao by the Sharif Kabungsuwan in about 14th century, the influence of religion reached the place through the people who settled and called themselves Maguindanao Muslims. However, there were minority groups such as Bagobos and B’laans who occupied the eastern highland portion.

The most known Muslim leader was Sultan Solaiman. When he died, Datu Mangko Ambag, the nephew continued to reign the jurisdiction with some advisors such as Dappil Tuden, Kasan Kandugon and Datu Parangan. They occupied the lowlands along the banks of the rivers. They made kaingins and fished in the rivers.

The famous leader of B’laans was Datu Dempon. Clashes occurred between the Muslims and B’laans which greatly affected the peace and order condition. The marriage of Datu Mangko to one of the beautiful young lass of the B’laans ended the trouble of the two groups. The B’laans were subjugated and placed under the umbrella of Datu Mangko. The addition of the B’laans to the Muslim group gave more strength and bigger income to Datu Mangko.

In early part of 1956, a group of leaders made a representation to the defunct Provincial Board of Cotabato headed Datu Udtog Matalam, requested for the separation of Tulunan from mother municipality, M’lang but failed due to the oppositions. The strong determination of the people to be independent was again represented by the group known as the “BIG FIVE” composed by Datu Dabpil Tuden, Arsenio Villamor Sr., Juan Jinen, Mauro Quibrantar and Jose Ordenia succeeded in their mission with flying colors.

On August 6, 1961, the late President Carlos P. Garcia signed Executive Order No. 441 separating Tulunan from mother municipality, M’lang. The first appointed officials were Datu Ibrahim Paglas Jr. as the municipal mayor; Arsenio Villamor Sr. as the Vice mayor; Datu Mangko Ambag, Roberto Jover Sr., Benito Cabello and Datu Diadel Kamag as Councilors and the first Municipal Secretary was Antonio Caballero.

Six month prior to the election 1963, Datu Ibrahim Paglas Jr. resigned as Municipal mayor of Tulunan in favor of his candidacy as Municipal mayor of Buluan. And by virtue of succession Vice Mayor Arsenio Villamor Sr. took his reigns and was considered the first Christian Mayor of Tulunan.

The result of the 1963 election placed Godofredo Laluyan on the pedestal as the first elected Mayor of Tulunan. However, the 1967 election turned the political wheel in favor of then Mayor Conrado Lemana who oversee the municipality until 1980 when he met his Waterloo. The vote of confidence of the people in the 1980 election was vested to the incumbent Municipal Mayor Josue Faustino. Mayor Faustino is implementing the various programs of the government with diligence and wisdom.

Geography
Tulunan, North Cotabato is geographically located at the southernmost part of Cotabato Province. On the north, it is bounded by M'lang; Datu Paglas, Maguindanao on the south; by Liguasan Marsh on the west; by Makilala on the north-eastern portion; and Magsaysay, Davao del Sur in the eastern part.

Barangays
Tulunan is politically subdivided into 29 barangays.

Climate

Tulunan has the climate, which is more or less evenly distributed throughout the year and a rainfall ranging from 60 mm. to 215mm. having an average annual rainfall of 115.04 mm. The months of January, February, March and December are marked dry season. All other months have occasional rains. Generally, January and December are the coldest month of the year. The average amount of temperature is 28.25 degree Celsius. The prevailing wind directions comes during wet / rainy season. Typhoon is seldom felt in the area as Tulunan is located outside of the typhoon belt and is protected by small mountains. However, during heavy rains, which cause the overflowing of river like Malasila, Tulunan and Bual Rivers, many crops and structures are destroyed.

These heavy downpours occur usually in the month of August and September. Identified places with severe flooding hazards are Barangays of: Damawato, Bual, Popoyon, Tambac, Bagumbayan, Minapan and Dungos giving a total of 1,200 hectares more or less with an equivalent of 3.43% of the total area. This climatic condition negatively affect the productivity of the farmers in the said barangays as floods could not be detected when to occur thus, destroying the crops varying from 50% to 100% of it.

Demographics

Economy

Agricultural products like rice and corn, upland rice, legumes, green onions, root crops, tobacco, rubber, vegetables, sorghum and coconuts.

Notable personalities

 Mary Jean Lastimosa - actress, model and Miss Universe Philippines 2014. She placed among the Top 10 finalists in Miss Universe 2014 held in Doral, Florida.

References

External links
 Tulunan Profile at the DTI Cities and Municipalities Competitive Index
 [ Philippine Standard Geographic Code]

Municipalities of Cotabato
Establishments by Philippine executive order